The Catholic University of Colombia is a private institution of higher education. It was founded in Bogotá, Colombia in 1970, notable in its early loyalty to Catholic church doctrine. The institution had more than ten thousand students in September 2019, of which the majority were undergraduates. The university has three campuses in the city of Bogota, a school, a language school, and a university campus in addition to being an office setting for students in Bogotá. It gives technical and technological careers (in Chia, a town near Bogota). The three most important sites are in Bogota, Chapinero, and Teusaquillo — characterized by their historical and cultural value. Its entire campus distributed in such sites totals about 77.000m2 with 44.000 m2 of buildings and 33,000 m2 for building.

After 40 years, the Catholic University of Colombia is one of the most representative universities in the country and is known for its Catholic doctrine in much of Latin America.

Undergraduate programs
The Universidad Catolica de Colombia offers eight undergraduate programs. It has approximately 11.000 students.

Architecture
Law
Economy
Civil engineering
Industrial Engineering
Systems Engineering
Electronics and telecommunications engineering
Psychology

Specializations (graduate programs)

 Work Management
 Pavement Engineering
 Water Resources
 Financial Management
 Formulation and Evaluation
 Systems Audit
 Network Security
 Quality and Performance
 Clinical Psychology
 Legal Psychology
 Educational Psychology
 Organizational Psychology
 Probation Law
 Criminal Law and Forensic Science
 Tax and Customs
 Governance and Management of Regional and Municipal Development
 Labor and Social Security
 Criminal Investigation and Criminal Trial in the Adversarial System

Masters
Political Science (in partnership with University of Salerno)
Psychology
Industrial Engineering

References

Universities and colleges in Colombia
Education in Bogotá
Catholic universities and colleges in Colombia